Marcos Luna Ruiz (born 5 April 2003) is a Spanish footballer who plays for Real Zaragoza as a right back.

Club career
Born in Zaragoza, Aragón, Luna was a Real Zaragoza youth graduate. He made his senior debut with the reserves on 6 January 2022, starting in a 2–0 Tercera División RFEF away loss against CD Giner Torrero.

Called up to the first team for the 2022 pre-season, Luna made his professional debut on 15 October of that year, coming on as a late substitute for Fran Gámez in a 2–1 home win over Villarreal CF B in the Segunda División.

On 9 November 2022, Luna renewed his contract until 2026.

References

External links

2003 births
Living people
Footballers from Zaragoza
Spanish footballers
Association football defenders
Segunda División players
Segunda Federación players
Tercera Federación players
Real Zaragoza B players
Real Zaragoza players